Monfarracinos is a municipality in Zamora, a province in the autonomous community of Castile-Leon, Spain. It is located 5 km. north of the capital in the direction of Villalpando.

References

Municipalities of the Province of Zamora